The Best of Cold Chisel: All for You is a greatest hits album released in October 2011 by Australian rock band, Cold Chisel. It debuted at No.2 in Australia  A limited edition included a bonus disc that featured a dozen of the band's most loved covers.

A Deluxe edition was released on 28 September 2018.

In 2019, the album was certified 4× Platinum in Australia.

Background
Following the death of the group's drummer, Steve Prestwich in 2011, Jimmy Barnes and company regrouped for their first new compositions in over 13 years. The album includes two new tracks, "All For You" and "HQ454 Monroe" and 18 greatest hits. The greatest hits tracks were chosen by their fans who voted for their favourites on their website.

The album's full track listing was announced on their website on 25 September 2011.

Reception

Anna-Maria Megalogenis from The AU Review gave the album 9/10, saying: "It is apparent that Cold Chisel produced some damn good Aussie pub rock songs, rich with lyrical imagery (penned mostly by keyboardist Don Walker), easy to sing along to and songs tinged with melancholia". She added, "Words fail to capture how damn good this album is".

Jon O'Brien from All Music said; "The Adelaide quintet's tales of excess have often overshadowed their musical output, but "All for You" is a labor of love proving that they deserve their legendary status.

Track listing

2011 release
CD1

2018 release (2CD set)
CD1

CD2

Charts

Weekly charts

Year-end charts
In 2011, it was the third-highest selling album by an Australian artist after Gotye's Making Mirrors and Reece Mastin's Reece Mastin. It was No. 17 over-all.

Decade-end charts

Certifications

Release history

References

2011 greatest hits albums
Cold Chisel albums
Compilation albums by Australian artists